1978 Japanese Super Cup was the Japanese Super Cup competition. The match was played at Osaka Nagai Stadium in Osaka on April 2, 1978. Fujita Industries won the championship.

Match details

References

Japanese Super Cup
1978 in Japanese football
Shonan Bellmare matches
Cerezo Osaka matches